Egilsstadir Upper Secondary School is a gymnasium (Icelandic: Menntaskóli) in the Eastern Region, Iceland

Egilsstadir Upper Secondary School was founded in 1979. For the first few years the school was housed in a building built in 1983 that now houses boarders. The official teaching block was opened in 1989, and in 2006 the school was further expanded. School students number over 300, including about 300 day students. The boarding house can accommodate about 120 students.

Schoolmasters from 1979 
 1979-1989: Vilhjálmur Einarsson
 1990-1993: Helgi Ómar Bragason
 1993-1994: Ólafur Jón Arnbjörnsson
 1994-1995: Vilhjálmur Einarsson
 1995-2008: Helgi Ómar Bragason
 2008-2009: Þorbjörn Rúnarsson
 2009-2016: Helgi Ómar Bragason
 2016-present: Árni Ólason

External links 
 
 
 Student council facebook site

Gymnasiums in Iceland
Educational institutions established in 1979
1979 establishments in Iceland